Rassa may refer to:

 Rässa, a village in Saare County, Estonia
 Rassa, Piedmont, town in Italy
 Refugee Advocacy Service of South Australia
 Rassa, alternative spelling for the village of Rassau in Wales
 Rassa, variante spelling for the region of Raška in Latin sources

See also
 Rasa (disambiguation)
 Raška (disambiguation)